The second season of Degrassi: The Next Generation, a Canadian serial teen drama television series, commenced airing in Canada on 29 September 2002 and concluded on 23 February 2003, consisting of twenty-two episodes. This season depicts the lives of a group of eighth and ninth grade school children as they deal with some of the challenges and issues teenagers face such as child abuse, hormones, date rape, body image, hate crimes, sexual identity, alcoholism, and protests. This is the first season to feature high school students from grade nine and the last season to feature middle school students. 

Filming began 10 June 2002, and continued into November 2002.

The second season aired Sundays at 7:00 p.m. on CTV, a Canadian terrestrial television network, and premiered with a sixty-minute special, "When Doves Cry", which form the first two episodes of season two. Additional episodes were also aired on Fridays during January 2003. In the United States, it was broadcast on the Noggin cable channel during its programming block for teenagers, The N. The season was released on DVD as a four disc boxed set on 21 June 2005 by Alliance Atlantis Home Entertainment in Canada, and by Funimation in the US. It is purchasable on iTunes.

A critical and popular success, the second season of Degrassi: The Next Generation was the most-watched Canadian drama series for Canada's younger viewers aged two to thirty-four. It was nominated in eight categories at the Gemini Awards, four categories at the Directors Guild of Canada Awards and the National Council on Family Relations Media Awards, and in two categories at the Young Artist Awards. Four episodes were also nominated at the Awards of Excellence Gala, hosted by the Alliance for Children and Television, what recognize quality Canadian children's programming.

Cast

Main cast
 Shane Kippel as Gavin "Spinner" Mason (20 episodes)
 Ryan Cooley as James Tiberius "J.T." Yorke (20 episodes)
 Andrea Lewis as Hazel Aden (20 episodes)
 Cassie Steele as Manuela "Manny" Santos (19 episodes)
 Daniel Clark as Sean Cameron (19 episodes)
 Dan Woods as Mr. Raditch (19 episodes)
 Miriam McDonald as Emma Nelson (18 episodes)
 Aubrey Graham as Jimmy Brooks (18 episodes)
 Melissa McIntyre as Ashley Kerwin (18 episodes)
 Jake Goldsbie as Toby Isaacs (18 episodes)
 Lauren Collins as Paige Michalchuk (18 episodes)
 Adamo Ruggiero as Marco Del Rossi (18 episodes)
 Stefan Brogren as Archie "Snake" Simpson (17 episodes)
 Stacey Farber as Ellie Nash (17 episodes)
 Jake Epstein as Craig Manning (15 episodes)
 Sarah Barrable-Tishauer as Liberty Van Zandt (14 episodes)
 Christina Schmidt as Terri McGreggor (14 episodes)
 Pat Mastroianni as Joey Jeremiah (10 episodes)

Recurring cast
 Katie Lai as Kendra Mason (17 episodes)
 Linlyn Lue as Ms. Laura Kwan  (14 episodes)
 Michael Kinney as Coach Darryl Armstrong (10 episodes)
 Alexa Steele as Angela Jeremiah (7 episodes)
 Melissa DiMarco as Daphne Hatzilakos (7 episodes)
 Amanda Stepto as Christine "Spike" Nelson (6 episodes)
 Mony Yassir as Nadia Jamir (6 episodes)
 Maria Vacratsis as Sheila (4 episodes)
 Kris Holden-Ried as Scott "Tracker" Cameron (3 episodes)
 Hugh Dillon as Albert Manning (3 episodes)
 Al Mukadam as Mohammed (3 episodes)
 Stacie Mistysyn as Caitlin Ryan (3 episodes)
 Shawn Roberts as Dean (3 episodes)
 Kit Weyman as Sully (3 episodes)
 Anais Granofsky as Lucy Fernandez (2 episodes)
 Dean Blundell as Dean (2 episodes)
 Roger Dunn as Mr. Morton (2 episodes)
 Maria Ricossa as Kate Kerwin (2 episodes)

Guest stars
 Siluck Saysanasy as Yick Yu (1 episode)
 Ivette Montieth as Angela's Teacher (1 episode)
 Amanda Dunn as Billie Holiday (1 episode)
 Jay "Mad Dog" Michaels as himself (1 episode)
 Richard Bauer as Photographer (1 episode)
 Christopher Bondy as Anxious Customer (1 episode)
 George Buza as Atilla (1 episode)
 Carla Collins as herself (1 episode)
 Barbara Mamabolo as Older Girl at Party (1 episode)
 Addison Brasil as Male Cheerleader (1 episode)
 Ayo Kamau as Ox (1 episode)
 Jacqueline Rose as Fareeza (1 episode)
 Ardon Bess as Wayne (1 episode)
 John Vasilantonakis as Bouncer (1 episode)
 Margaret Ma as Cake Delivery Person (1 episode)
 Rob Salem as Minister (1 episode)
 Marya Delver as Fancy/Connie (1 episode)
 Sue Johanson as Dr. Sally (1 episode)
 Jari Salminen as Party Guest (1 episode)
 Tom Melissis as Mr. Dom Perino (1 episode)
 Caitlin Dahl as Store Clerk (1 episode)
 Nigel Hamer as Jeff Isaacs (1 episode)
 Jennifer Podemski as Ms. Chantel Sauvé (1 episode)
 Mark Taylor as Referee (1 episode)
 Diana Reis as Nurse (1 episode)
 Robin Bublick as Geography Teacher (1 episode)
 Vivian George as Waitress (1 episode)
 Stewart Arnott as Minister (1 episode)
 Tony Meylar as Dr. Watley (1 episode)
 Meeka Schiro as Tanning Salon Employee (1 episode)

Crew
The season was produced by Epitome Pictures and CTV. The executive producers are Epitome Pictures' CEO and Degrassi: The Next Generation co-creator Linda Schuyler, and her husband, Epitome president Stephen Stohn. Degrassi: The Next Generation co-creator Yan Moore served as the creative consultant and David Lowe was the line producer. Aaron Martin served as the executive story editor. James Hurst served as the story editor, with Shelley Scarrow as the junior story editor. The writers for the season are Tassie Cameron, Craig Cornell, James Hurst, Sean Jara, Aaron Martin, Yan Moore, Susin Nielsen, Clare Ross Dunn, Shelley Scarrow, Jana Sinyor, David Sutherland, and Brendon Yorke. The season's directors are Bruce McDonald, Philip Earnshaw, Paul Fox, Anais Granofsky, and Stefan Scaini.

Reception
Well received by critics and audience alike, Degrassi: The Next Generation'''s second season became the most-watched domestic drama series for Canada's three younger age groups of children aged two to eleven, teenagers aged twelve to seventeen and adults aged eighteen to thirty-four.

The season was not without controversy, however. There are a number of episodes with scenes of one teenager being beaten by his father. When reviewing those episodes, the Ryerson University of Toronto said the show "stands on its own" in reflecting "the kinds of issues [teenagers are] facing in their own lives ... handled with care and consideration, without all the glamour of a Hollywood soap opera." A two-part storyline about date-rape proved too risqué for The N officials, who delayed its broadcasting until suitable edits could be made, and other special treatments were available in the form of panel discussions, online parental guides and separately filmed introductions. The Gazette said, "You've got to hand it to the creative team behind CTV's justly celebrated teen series, Degrassi: The Next Generation. They're nothing if not a clever bunch", and Brian Orloff of the St. Petersburg Times praised the series as it "stays in touch with teens' lives".

By the end of 2003, the season had been nominated for or won several awards. The Gemini Awards named Degrassi: The Next Generation'' the "Best Children's or Youth Fiction Program or Series" and nominated it for "Best Short Dramatic Program". It won the "Best Interactive" category for its connection with the official website, which also won in the "Best Website" category. Bruce McDonald took home the Gemini award for "Best Direction in a Children's or Youth Program or Series" for the episode "Weird Science", and "White Wedding" earned a nomination for Stephen Withrow in the "Best Picture Editing in a Dramatic Series". "Careless Whisper" garnered Aaron Martin and Craig Cornell a nomination for "Best Writing for a Children's or Youths' Program or Series", and Jake Epstein's performance in "Tears Are Not Enough" secured him the award for "Best Performance in a Children's or Youth Program or Series". At the second annual Directors Guild of Canada Awards, "White Wedding" received recognition for Bruce McDonald in the "Outstanding Achievement in Direction - Television Series" category, and Stephen Stanley in the "Outstanding Achievement in Production Design - Short Form" category. "When Doves Cry" won in team category for "Outstanding Achievement in a Television Series - Children's", and earned Stephen Withrow an honor in the category for "Outstanding Achievement in Picture Editing - Short Form". Jake Epstein's acting earned him a second award when the Young Artist Awards gave him the award for "Best Performance in a TV Comedy Series Leading Young Actor", and the young cast was nominated for "Best Ensemble in a TV Series (Comedy or Drama)".

Episodes
CTV originally aired episode fourteen, "Careless Whisper", two days before episodes twelve and the thirteen, the hour-long special "White Wedding". Episode eighteen, "Dressed in Black" aired before episode seventeen, "Relax".

In the US, The N aired season two in two blocks. The first block aired 7 October 2002 to 13 January 2003. The second block of episodes aired 11 July 2003 to 29 August 2003, but the episodes did not air in the order intended by the producers. The season finale of season one, "Jagged Little Pill", had been held over, and was shown in an edited format as this season's third episode, along with season two's true third episode to form an hour-long special. Due to the sensitive subject of rape, episodes seven and eight, the "Shout" two-part special, were held over until 11 July 2003, and opened the second half of the season creating an hour-and-a-half long special with episode twenty, "How Soon Is Now?". Because of plot continuity, episode nine, "Mirror in the Bathroom", was also held back and had its first US airing in the second week of the second block of the season, before episodes fifteen through nineteen continued to air in the correct order, followed by episodes nineteen and twenty, "Tears Are Not Enough, Parts One and Two" which were broadcast as an hour-long season finale. In re-runs and syndication, the episodes have all aired in the order the producers intended. Every episode is named after a song from the 1980s.

This list is by order of production, as they appear on the DVD.

DVD release
The DVD release of season two was released by Alliance Atlantis Home Entertainment in Canada, and by FUNimation Entertainment in the US on 21 June 2005 after it had completed broadcast on television. As well as every episode from the season, the DVD release features bonus material including deleted scenes, bloopers and behind-the-scenes featurettes. in Australia Season 2 is currently being released by Umbrella Entertainment.

References

Notes

External links
Season 2 episode synopses at CTV Television Network
 

Degrassi: The Next Generation seasons
2002 Canadian television seasons
2003 Canadian television seasons